Fannin County Electric Cooperative, Inc is a non-profit rural electric utility cooperative headquartered in Bonham, Texas.

The Cooperative was organized in 1937.

The Cooperative serves portions of five counties in the state of Texas, in a territory generally surrounding Bonham.

Currently the Cooperative has 1,829 miles of line and 837,664 meters.

External links
Fannin County Electric Cooperative

Companies based in Texas
Electric cooperatives in Texas
Collin County, Texas
Fannin County, Texas
Grayson County, Texas
Hunt County, Texas
Lamar County, Texas
1937 establishments in Texas